Robat (also Romanized as Robāţ, Rebāt, and Ribāt) is a village in Qushkhaneh-ye Pain Rural District, Qushkhaneh District, Shirvan County, North Khorasan Province, Iran. Its population was reported as 1,148 in the 2006 census, divided between 257 families.

References 

Populated places in Shirvan County